Danielle Martin is a Canadian physician, health care administrator and an associate professor at the University of Toronto.

Career
Dr. Martin completed her bachelor's degree in science from McGill University and her M.D. at the University of Western Ontario. She also holds a master's degree in public policy from the Munk School of Global Affairs and Public Policy at the University of Toronto. Currently, she is the Chair of the Department of Family and Community Medicine (DFCM), University of Toronto. Previously, she was the vice president, medical affairs and health system solutions at Women's College Hospital (WCH), and the founder of the WCH Institute for Health System Solutions and Virtual Care (WIHV). She is also a family physician in the Family Practice Health Centre at WCH, and professor in the Departments of Family and Community Medicine and Health Policy, Management and Evaluation and School of Public Policy and Governance at the University of Toronto. In 2016, she was awarded the CIHR-IHSPR Article of the Year Award for her work on the Estimated cost of universal public coverage of prescription drugs in Canada.

She has debated in favour of Canada's national health care system. On September 13, 2017 she spoke in support of Senator Bernie Sanders Medicare For All bill, which would seek to introduce a single-payer system of health care in the U.S. On March 13, 2014 she appeared at a US Senate Committee investigation on health care systems, specifically regarding issues such as single-payer and multi-payer systems and wait times. After her appearance at this US Senate Committee hearing, she was invited to be a candidate at various levels of Canadian government (municipal, provincial and federal) by various political parties.

In 2006, she started the organization Canadian Doctors for Medicare. She won the Canadian Medical Association award for young leaders. In 2013, the Toronto Star called her one of 13 people to watch.

Dr. Martin has also made several appearances on CBC Television's The National as part of its Checkup Panel segment.

Dr. Martin is the author of the book Better Now: Six Big Ideas to Improve Health Care for All Canadians, Penguin Canada, 2017.

References

External links

20th-century Canadian physicians
21st-century Canadian physicians
Canadian women physicians
Canadian medical academics
Canadian women academics
Canadian medical researchers
Living people
Year of birth missing (living people)
McGill University Faculty of Science alumni
University of Western Ontario alumni
University of Toronto alumni
Canadian general practitioners
20th-century women physicians
21st-century women physicians
Family physicians
20th-century Canadian women scientists